The eleventh HMS Vanguard of the Royal Navy is the lead boat of her class of Trident ballistic missile-armed submarines. The submarine is based at Faslane, HMNB Clyde, Argyll, Scotland.

Vanguard was built at Barrow-in-Furness by Vickers Shipbuilding and Engineering Ltd, later BAE Systems Submarine Solutions, was launched on 4 March 1992, and commissioned on 14 August 1993 in the presence of Diana, Princess of Wales.

Operational history

Entry into service 
The submarine's first commanding officer was Captain David Russell and the senior engineer officer, during build, was Commander James Grant OBE.

Refit 
In February 2002, Vanguard began a two-year refit at HMNB Devonport. The refit was completed in June 2004 and in October 2005, Vanguard completed her return to service trials (Demonstration and Shakedown Operations) with the firing of an unarmed Trident missile. During this refit, Vanguard was boarded by a pair of anti-nuclear protesters who spent half an hour on board before being challenged. They were charged with damaging a fence which they cut to access the submarine.

Collision with Le Triomphant 

On 4 February 2009, Vanguard collided with the French submarine  in the Atlantic. On February 6 the French Ministry of Armed Forces reported that Triomphant had "collided with an immersed object". The United Kingdom Ministry of Defence initially would not comment on the incident, but was confirmed on February 16 by First Sea Lord Sir Jonathon Band. Vanguard had returned to HMNB Clyde in Scotland under her own power two days prior. Band stated that the collision had occurred at slow speed, and that there had been no injuries. However, both vessels had been damaged. Vanguard received damage to the outer casing in the area of the missile compartment, requiring repairs.

Overhaul and refueling 
In January 2012 radiation was detected in the PWR2 test reactor's coolant water, caused by a microscopic breach in fuel cladding. This discovery led to Vanguard being scheduled to be refuelled in its next "deep maintenance period", due to last 3.5 years from 2015, and contingency measures being applied to other Vanguard and  submarines, at a cost of £270 million. This was not revealed to the public until 2014.

Vanguard eventually returned to active service in July 2022 after spending almost 7 years undergoing refit. On 16 August 2022 Vanguard was rededicated into the Royal Navy in a ceremony held at HMNB Devonport.

Glued bolts during overhaul 
In February 2023, the Royal Navy began investigating claims that broken bolts for the reactor chamber on Vanguard had insufficiently been repaired using glue, during her seven year refit. After the heads of several bolts had been sheared off after being over-tightened, workers for defence firm Babcock had allegedly glued the heads on the bolts back on, rather than completely replacing the bolts. The glued bolts held insulation in place on the coolant pipes for the nuclear reactor, and were found shortly prior to activation of the reactor.

Defence Secretary Ben Wallace demanded a meeting and “assurances about future work” after The Sun reported on the issue. Babcock is one of the United Kingdom's largest defence contractors, with contracts for the maintenance of both the Royal Navy's Astute-class and Vanguard-class submarine fleets. Labour Party shadow secretary of state for defence John Healey stated that "the Defence Secretary must make sure contractors are delivering maintenance to this critical capability safely, on time and on-budget.".

See also
 Letters of last resort
 List of submarines of the Royal Navy
 List of submarine classes of the Royal Navy
 Nuclear weapons and the United Kingdom
 Royal Navy Submarine Service
 Submarine-launched ballistic missile
 Trident nuclear programme

References

External links

 Royal Navy HMS Vanguard (royalnavy.mod.uk)

 

Vanguard-class submarines
Ships built in Barrow-in-Furness
1992 ships
Submarines of the United Kingdom
1992 in England